Caloptilia cirrhopis is a moth of the family Gracillariidae. It is known from Tasmania, Australia.

References

cirrhopis
Moths of Australia
Moths described in 1907